Beat is the second studio album by American band Bowery Electric. It was released on November 12, 1996 by Kranky.

The cover art is taken from Catherine Opies’ Untitled #27, the photos were taken somewhere near Corona Del Mar Fwy, a freeway located in Costa Mesa, California.

Recording
Beat was recorded and co-produced by Bowery Electric and Rich Costey at Studio .45 in Hartford, Connecticut in June 1996. Drummer Wayne Magruder contributed to four of the ten tracks.

Music
Lawrence Chandler of Bowery Electric told Alternative Press "Beat is the beginning of us learning our way around a proper sampler and software which allows us to work with samples on the computer. We can sample ourselves, manipulate sounds, create our own beats and basically work with fewer restrictions."

Release and promotion 
Beat was released on November 12, 1996 by Kranky. Beggars Banquet Records licensed Beat for release in the United Kingdom and Europe. Two singles, "Without Stopping" and "Coming Down", were released from the album. Bowery Electric toured the United Kingdom and North America following the album's release.

Bowery Electric co-headlined the Music in the Anchorage festival with Mogwai in New York on June 20, 1997.
They performed in London on July 16, 1997 and on The Think Stage at The Phoenix Festival. Reviewing a concert during the tour, Melody Maker noted "for two people to be able to create such a huge, rolling epic sound is surprising; what really hits hard is just how huge it can be, how the inarguable and pulverising beauty of BE's sound simply forces a slacked out crowd into its swell."
A John Peel Session was recorded at Maida Vale Studios in London on July 20, 1997 and broadcast on BBC Radio 1 August 7, 1997.

The album was reissued in the United States by Kranky on November 18, 2016.

Reception

Melody Maker named the album the "rock LP of the year", and The Wire praised the album as "genre-defining". Neil Strauss of The New York Times rated it in his 1997 selection of albums "that haven't received much attention but are worth the extra time it takes to hunt for them". In a 2016 review of the album's reissue, The Wire wrote: "This music hasn't aged a bit. ... [It] remains an unexplored road to a wondrous promontory only Bowery Electric have ever reached".

Track listing

"Low Density" is included in the 2016 repress.

Personnel
Credits are adapted from the Beat sleeve.
 Martha Schwendener – bass, keyboards, vocals
 Lawrence Chandler – guitar, keyboards, programming, vocals
 Rich Costey – production
 Bowery Electric – production
 Wayne Magruder – drums (on tracks 2, 7, 8, 9)
 Catherine Opie – photography ("Untitled No 27" from her Freeway Series)

References

1996 albums
Bowery Electric albums
Kranky albums
Beggars Banquet Records albums
Albums produced by Rich Costey